Heule is a submunicipality of the city of Kortrijk in the Belgian province of West Flanders. The first notion of this settlement date of the year 1111. Heule has a surface of 1169h and has a population of 10,503 (2009). Surrounding villages of Heule are Bissegem, Gullegem, Lendelede and Kuurne. Between Kuurne, Lendelede and Heule there's also the settlement Sente (Saint-Katherine).

Name 

It's said that the city's name is derived from the current that runs through Heule, namely the Heulebeek. Another opinion is that it's derived from the words geul or geule which is the ditch in which the current flows.

Sights 

 In the public garden there's a set of tree rare baldcypresses (Taxodium distichum).
 The Preetjes Molen, the only flax attrition mill in Europe, can be found in Heule.
 Until 2001, the Curiosamuseum founded by Antoon Vanneste was established in the Peperstraat.

Culture 

The popular song 'Tineke van Heule' thanks its name to the village. Every year in the second weekend of September, the Tinekesfeesten are organized in the village. Also the ward Heule-Watermolen organizes these elections of Tineke.

In Heule, the famous Flemish writer Stijn Streuvels (Franciscus Petrus Maria (Frank) Lateur) was born on the third of October in the year 1871. A memorial stone was set up in the Kortrijkstraat. Several wards in Heule have got the name of one of his famous works, like de Vlaschaard, Zomertij, Najaar en Winterland.

Well-known people from Heule 

 Stijn Streuvels (1871–1969), writer
 Gerard Debaets (1899), cyclist
 Michel en Gaston-Octave Debaets, cyclists and brothers of Gerard Debaets.
 Alois Vansteenkiste (1928–1991), cyclist
 Lucien De Muynck (1931), athlete
 Lieven Bertels (1971)

External links 

 Heule
 Tinekesfeesten
 Stad Kortrijk
 Cyclists

Sub-municipalities of Kortrijk
Populated places in West Flanders